This list of rampage killers contains those cases where only vehicles were used to attack people. Since it may be quite difficult to distinguish accidents, or cases of reckless driving from those incidents where the driver, or pilot, had the intention to harm others, only those cases are included where it is clear that the vehicle was applied as a weapon and crashed deliberately into people, other vehicles, or buildings. Also, those cases where a rampage killer used an armed vehicle, such as a tank, or a fighter aircraft, to shoot others are listed here. Airliners and trains are not included in this section but in other incidents.

A rampage killer has been defined as follows:

This list should contain every case with at least one of the following features:
 Rampage killings with 6 or more dead 
 Rampage killings with at least 4 people killed and least ten victims overall (dead plus injured)
 Rampage killings with at least 2 people killed and least 12 victims overall (dead plus injured)
 An incidence of rampage killing shall not be included in this list if it does not include at least two people killed.
 In all cases the perpetrator is not counted among those killed or injured.

Rampage killers

References

Rampages
vehicular
Vehicular rampage
Killings by type